The OSI-Ford 20 M TS is a coupe produced by the Italian car manufacturer Officine Stampaggi Industriali (abbreviated OSI).

Description 

Sergio Sartorelli, who also designed the Volkswagen Karmann Ghia Type 34, was responsible for the design in 1965. The vehicle was technically based on the  Ford 20M and was manufactured between 1967 and 1968. There were 870 cars with two-liter V6 engine and 409 with 2.3-liter V6 at prices of 14,900 DM and 15,200 DM admitted in Germany. A unique OSI Ford convertible was shown at the 1967 Paris Salon. In 1968 OSI went into bankruptcy. 

Since 1987, the OSI Owners Association in Germany with reproductions and annual meetings cares about the legacy of OSI. Sources vary on the total number of cars made: some suggest 2200, others 3500, while only around 200 examples are known to exist today.

References

External links 
 

Cars introduced in 1967
Coupés
Sports cars